Moonyeenn Lee (February 1944 – 18 July 2020) was a South African casting director, talent agent and producer. She earned Primetime Emmy Award nominations for her work on the Hulu series The Looming Tower and the 2016 Roots remake. She became the first South African member of both the Motion Picture and Television Academies.

Lee founded the talent agency Moonyeenn Lee & Associates (MLA) in 1974 and Khulisa Productions in 1998. She was awarded the Lionel Ngakane Lifetime Achievement Award at the 2017 South African Film and Television Awards.

Early and personal life
Lee was born in Johannesburg. She was named after a character from the 1932 film Smilin' Through. She moved to England, where she was mostly educated, when she was 7 for her mother Shirley Hepburn's work as a stage actress whilst her father stayed behind in South Africa. She began working for a knitwear company in London at 17.

Lee and salesman Leon Lee were married for five years and divorced in 1974. The pair had a son David and a daughter Cindy. After her divorce, Lee was looking for a new career. She trained to become an agent with James Fraser of Fraser and Dunlop in England.

Lee raised her children in Parkmore, who both now work in the entertainment industry. She later lived in Rosebank.

Lee's agency MLA announced Lee had died at the age of 76 in Johannesburg of complications related to COVID-19 on the morning of 18 July 2020. A number of actors, other industry people, and Minister of Arts and Culture Nathi Mthethwa paid their tributes.

Filmography

Film

Television

Awards and nominations

References

External links
 
 Moonyeenn Lee at TVSA

1944 births
2020 deaths
Deaths from the COVID-19 pandemic in South Africa
People from Johannesburg
South African casting directors
Women casting directors
South African women company founders
Talent managers